Michael Perreca is an American director. In 1993 he directed The Wind and the Willows by Douglas Post.

In 1999 he was named artistic director of the Bristol Valley Theater in Naples. In addition to directing, he also voiced the main role of Kanji Sasahara in Genshiken and Kujibiki Unbalance.

Perreca is presently an Adjunct Lecturer at City University of New York-Brooklyn College and a creative director/event writer for large-scale fundraising events. These events include The New York Yankees Homecoming Dinner, The Statue of Liberty/Ellis Island Awards, UNCF "A Mind Is…" Gala, Brooklyn Tech Centennial Celebration and Titans of Tech, The Alzheimer's Association Rita Hayworth Gala, United Way Gridiron Gala, Partnership With Children Gala, and the Financial Women's Association "Women of the Year" Awards, among others. He was Artistic Director, Theater Programs, at LeAp-Learning through an Expanded Arts Program, Inc. Perreca was also Executive Director of Royal Family Productions in Manhattan, and Producing Director of Barrington Stage Company in Massachusetts.

References

Year of birth missing (living people)
Living people
American male voice actors
Brooklyn College faculty